Laceyella tengchongensis  is a thermophilic bacterium from the genus of Laceyella which has been isolated from soil from the Big Empty Volcano in Tengchong in China.

References

External links
Type strain of Laceyella tengchongensis at BacDive -  the Bacterial Diversity Metadatabase	

Bacillales
Bacteria described in 2010
Thermophiles